Kemme is a surname. Notable people with the surname include:

Carl A. Kemme (born 1960), Catholic bishop in the United States
Tabea Kemme (born 1991), German football player

See also
Kemmer